F Letter: New Russian Feminist Poetry (October 2020) is a collection of contemporary poetry edited by Galina Rymbu, Eugene Ostashevsky, and Ainsley Morse. According to its publisher, isolarii, it is the first anthology of feminist poetry from Russia in any language. Rymbu, in the introduction to the book, writes that F Letter is “a secret burrow, an island of freedom.” The works are published in both English and Russian, with a foreword by poet Eileen Myles and philosopher Amia Srinivasan.

Poets in the anthology include Egana Djabbarova, Lolita Agamalov, Oksana Vasyakina, Nastya Denisova, and Ekaterina Simonova. The title of the book comes from the Russian-language journal , which has published LGBTQ+ and feminist poetry since 2017 and was founded by Galina Rymbu.

References 

2020 poetry books
Russian poetry collections
English poetry collections
Feminist literature